Clemons may refer to:

Clemons, Iowa, United States
Clemons, Kentucky
Clemons (surname)